= Curt Görans =

- Origin: Eskilstuna, Sweden
- Genres: dansband music
- Years active: 1970s?

Curt Görans was a dansband from Eskilstuna, Sweden, scoring mid 1970s Svensktoppen chart successes.

== Svensktoppen songs ==
- Dansa dansa dansa - 1974
- Min sommardröm - 1975
- Ta min hand - 1977
- Välkommen sommar - 1977
